Eldrid Erdal (30 January 1901 – 1 December 1997) was a Norwegian politician for the Liberal Party.

She was born in Naustdal.

She served as a deputy representative to the Norwegian Parliament from Møre og Romsdal during the term 1961–1965.

On the local level she was a deputy member of Molde city council from 1951 to 1967.

References

1901 births
1997 deaths
Liberal Party (Norway) politicians
Deputy members of the Storting
Møre og Romsdal politicians
People from Molde
People from Naustdal